James Morris ( – September 7, 1827) was an American lawyer who served as Sheriff of New York County.

Early life
He was the fourth son of Mary ( Walton) Morris and Founding Father Lewis Morris, third lord of the manor of Morrisania. His father was a prominent landowner who was a signer of the U.S. Declaration of Independence as a delegate to the Continental Congress from New York.

Following the British conquest of New York in 1776, the family was driven from Morrisania, first to Philadelphia then to Rocky Hill near Princeton, New Jersey. He likely completed preparatory studies in Nassau Hall's grammar school before attending Princeton from which he graduated in 1784. While at Princeton, he was a member of the American Whig Society.

Career
After Princeton, he began to study law and was admitted to the bar in the fall of 1787.

In 1797, he was one of three justices appointed for trial of cases and in December 1798, he was appointed to the post of Sheriff of New York County and City, which he was reappointed in each of the two succeeding years.

Personal life
On February 1, 1796, Morris was married to Helen Van Cortlandt (1768–1812), a daughter of Augustus Van Cortlandt and Catherine ( Barclay) Van Cortlandt. Her paternal grandparents were Frederick Van Cortlandt and Frances ( Jay) Van Cortlandt. Her maternal grandparents were Andrew Barclay and Helena (née Roosevelt) Barclay. Together, they were the parents of twelve children.

Morris died in 1827.

References

1764 births
1827 deaths
James
People from the Bronx
American people of Dutch descent
American people of English descent
Princeton University alumni
People of the Province of New York
Sheriffs of New York County, New York